Hydroxypregnenolone may refer to:

 17α-Hydroxypregnenolone
 21-Hydroxypregnenolone

See also
 Hydroxyprogesterone

Pregnanes